Melaniya Vytvytska (née: Stelmah; December 31, 1887 – September 9, 1963) was a Ukrainian public figure. The wife of the second President of the Ukrainian People's Republic in exile, Stepan Vytvytskyi, she was also an activist of the Ukrainian women's movement.

In 1910 she married Stepan Vytvytskyi. In 1912, they had a son, Ihor Vytvitskyi.

From July 16, 1935, she was a member of the social assistance committee of the magistrate staff of the city of Drohobych.

On October 11, 1936, she was elected a member of the secretary of the Ukrainian National Society for the Protection of Children and guardianship of young people.

She worked in the Committee on Assistance to Political Prisoners, who were often sentenced by Polish courts for a long time, and in the Committee on Assistance to Military Persons with Disabilities.

She died on September 28, 1963, after a long and serious illness.

On October 2, 1963, she was buried at the Evergreen Cemetery in New Jersey.

References

1887 births
1963 deaths
First Ladies of Ukraine
Ukrainian humanitarians
Women humanitarians
People from Drohobych
People from the Kingdom of Galicia and Lodomeria
Ukrainian Austro-Hungarians
American people of Ukrainian descent
Burials in New Jersey